The Watab River, also known as Watab Creek, is a  tributary of the Mississippi River in Stearns County in central Minnesota in the United States.  It rises north of St. Joseph at the confluence of its North and South Forks, and flows northeast through Watab Lake, then east into the Mississippi River at Sartell.

History
The word watab comes from the Anishinaabe/Ojibwe language wadab-ziibi ("river with spruce-roots") due to the exposed spruce roots once found along its banks, which comes from the Algonquian watap, the cordage used for sewing together the birch-bark panels on a canoe.

In 1825 the Watab formed the first part of the border on the west side of the Mississippi between the Anishinaabe/Ojibwe to the north and the Dakota/Sioux to the south, and 20 years later the southern boundary for the Winnebago/Ho-Chunk Long Prairie Reservation of less than ten years' duration.

See also
 List of rivers of Minnesota

References

Rivers of Minnesota
Tributaries of the Mississippi River
Rivers of Stearns County, Minnesota